Joël Lobban, known professionally as Joël, is a Canadian singer/songwriter/dancer from Toronto, Ontario. He makes alternative R&B music armed with honest, introspective lyrics and a penchant for heartbreaking melodies. Pigeons & Planes named Joël in their March 2019 article one of '11 Rising Artists Who Defy Genre'.

Discography
Joël released two singles in 2017. "Stuck With Me" was released in summer 2017 and "Brandy" was released in late 2017. The single "Vent" was released on November 30, 2018, worldwide, followed up by "Type" on February 22, 2019. He is currently working on an album called 'Grunge Gospel' with producer Colin Munroe.

Music videos
The official music video for "Vent" was a DIY video shot in a warehouse and was released on December 23, 2018.

References

External links
 

Canadian rhythm and blues singers
Musicians from Toronto
Living people
Year of birth missing (living people)
21st-century Black Canadian male singers